"Show Me the Meaning of Being Lonely" is a song by American boy band Backstreet Boys, taken from their third studio album, Millennium (1999). It was written by Max Martin and Herbie Crichlow, with production by Martin and Kristian Lundin.

Jive Records selected the track to be released as the third single from the album, on December 14, 1999. It received generally favorable reviews from music critics, who commended the lush orchestration, its melody and the group's vocal performance. The song was one of 3 tracks to be previewed at the end of Britney Spears' debut album, ...Baby One More Time. It has also experienced success on the charts, reaching the top 10 in most countries it charted, also peaking at number three on the UK Singles Chart and number six on the US Billboard Hot 100 chart.

The music video for the track was released on New Year's Eve of 1999 and was directed by Stuart Gosling. It follows each of the band members in a separate dramatic history, with the band uniting for the video's end. The song also earned a Grammy award nomination during the 43rd Grammy Awards for Best Pop Performance by a Duo or Group with Vocals.

Background and release
"Show Me the Meaning of Being Lonely" was written by Max Martin and Herbie Crichlow, while Martin also produced it. On the November 27, 1999, issue of Billboard Magazine, it was reported that Jive Records selected "Show Me the Meaning of Being Lonely" as Millenniums third single. The song was sent to US radio on December 14, 1999, and was released in the United Kingdom as a CD and cassette single on February 21, 2000.

Composition
"Show Me the Meaning of Being Lonely" is a pop and R&B ballad, with Latin pop influences. Lyrically, the song deals with heartbreak and how the protagonist is dealing with loneliness. "Show me the meaning of being lonely/Is this the feeling I need to walk with/Tell me why I can't be there where you are/There's something missing in my heart," they sing in the chorus. It is set in the key of F♯ minor and G♯ minor.

Critical reception
The song received acclaim from most music critics. Stephen Thomas Erlewine of AllMusic picked it as a standout track on the album. While reviewing their compilation, The Hits: Chapter One (2001), Erlewine wrote that "the rest of the singles that fill out the compilation aren't quite as good as "I Want It That Way", "As Long as You Love Me", "Quit Playing Games (with My Heart)", "Everybody (Backstreet's Back)" and "Larger than Life" (although "Show Me the Meaning of Being Lonely" is)." Chuck Taylor of Billboard named it a "keepsake ballad that will have the quintet's loyal legions panting over their loss and loneliness." Taylor also called it "a beautifully produced anthem," and praised its melody, writing that, "it will instantly lock itself into the pop culture consciousness." Taylor finished his review, writing that the single is "the best ballad of the season and a sure-fine way to return the Boys to full glory." Chuck Arnold from People Magazine said that it "captures the ache of 'something missing in my heart' with a Latin-tinged lushness." Arion Berger of Rolling Stone commented that the song "digs its melodic claws into your skull on the first listen—it's the swooniest blending of the five vocalists' timbres to date, and mighty pretty besides."

Commercial performance
"Show Me the Meaning of Being Lonely" was a success on the charts, reaching the top-ten in most countries it charted. In the United States, the song debuted at number 74 on the Billboard Hot 100 chart while on the issue of March 18, 2000, the song peaked at number six, remaining at the peak position for two further weeks. In other Billboard component charts, the song also succeeded, topping the Top 40 Mainstream chart and reaching number two on the Hot Adult Contemporary Tracks. In Canada, the song topped the RPM Top Singles chart for two weeks.

In the United Kingdom, "Show Me the Meaning of Being Lonely" peaked at number three, becoming their last single to reach the top-three and eleventh top-ten single. The song became a success in countries like the Netherlands, New Zealand, Sweden and Switzerland, reaching number two. It also reached the top-ten in Austria, Belgium, Finland, Germany, Ireland, Italy and Norway. It only performed moderately in Australia, where it reached number 19, becoming their lowest charting-single since "Quit Playing Games (with My Heart)" in 1997.

Accolades
"Show Me the Meaning of Being Lonely" was nominated for a Grammy award on the 43rd ceremony for Best Pop Performance by a Duo or Group with Vocals, but lost it to Steely Dan's "Cousin Dupree". Emily Exton of VH1 placed the song at number seven on their "20 Backstreet Boys Songs" list, writing that the song is "a more mature sound that showcased Kevin’s vocals instead of mostly his dark and mysterious looks. Here the Boys tackle grief surprisingly well, without pouring on too much schmaltz or over-complicating things." Danielle Sweeney of The Celebrity Cafe also placed it at number seven on her "Top 10 Backstreet Boys Songs", writing that, "it's their most emotional song, containing the lyrics, 'how can it be you’re asking me to feel the things you never show?'. Deep, guys."

Music video
Background
The music video for "Show Me the Meaning of Being Lonely" was directed by Stuart Gosling in Los Angeles from December 11–12, 1999, following the 1999 Billboard Music Awards. It follows each of the band members separately in a sad story, until they unite during the instrumental break and final choruses. The video, somewhat darker in tone than any of the band's previous releases, touches on several of the band's real-life issues. Brian Littrell had undergone open heart surgery the previous year for a defect he has had since birth. AJ McLean is shown holding a picture of a girlfriend which is dedicated to a dear friend of his who died in a car accident. The video also uses footage that represents Kevin Richardson and his deceased father. Nick Carter's scene sees him save a woman to represent the fan who almost got run over by a bus. The woman who Howie Dorough sees represents his sister, who died a year earlier of the disease lupus. Additionally, the bus that McLean rides is marked for "Denniz Street", and is driven by an actor who resembles Denniz PoP (who died in 1998 and produced some Backstreet Boys tracks, besides being the mentor of the song's producer Max Martin). An alternate version of the video was dedicated in his honor.

Synopsis
The video begins at a hospital, in which Brian Littrell watches doctors try to save a patient, also portrayed by Littrell, alluding to his open heart surgery he had. AJ McLean's scenes take place on a coach bus, which is driven by an actor who looks like Denniz Pop, while mourning the loss of a girlfriend whose photo he carries. He sees her appear on the bus, but she fades away. Kevin Richardson watches an old-age film of himself and his father in an apartment. Nick Carter walks down a city street in the rain and saves a woman from almost being hit by the bus that McLean is on. Howie Dorough drinks from a teacup at an old-style bar as a woman in red runs towards him, but fades away before she reaches him. Richardson arrives to meet Dorough and they leave the building together. McLean's bus arrives, and Littrell exits the hospital. While the woman lights the memorial candles for the deceased, the five band members congregate and begin walking down the street together. Most of the video is shot in a desaturated scheme in which only certain red elements were brightly colored, until the very end of the video when the band walks out of the city into a brightly colored field.

Track listings
 UK CD single "Show Me the Meaning of Being Lonely" – 3:54
 "I'll Be There for You" – 4:34
 "You Wrote the Book on Love" – 4:38

 US 2×12-inch vinyl'
 "Show Me the Meaning of Being Lonely" (Soul Solution House of Loneliness Vocal) – 7:22
 "Show Me the Meaning of Being Lonely" (Jason Nevins Crossover Instrumental) – 3:57 [track only, no vocals]
 "Show Me the Meaning of Being Lonely" (Soul Solution Mix Show Version) – 4:12
 "Show Me the Meaning of Being Lonely" (LP Version) – 3:54
 "Show Me the Meaning of Being Lonely" (Jason Nevins Crossover Remix) – 3:55
 "Show Me the Meaning of Being Lonely" (Remix Acapella) – 3:55 [vocals only, no track]
 "Show Me the Meaning of Being Lonely" (Soul Solution House of Loneliness Dub) – 6:50 [track only, no vocals]
 "Show Me the Meaning of Being Lonely" (Bonus Beats) – 2:55 [track only, no vocals]

Charts

Weekly charts

Year-end charts

Certifications

Release history

See also
 List of Romanian Top 100 number ones of the 2000s

References

1998 songs
1999 singles
1990s ballads
Backstreet Boys songs
Jive Records singles
Music videos directed by Stuart Gosling
Number-one singles in Romania
Pop ballads
RPM Top Singles number-one singles
Song recordings produced by Max Martin
Songs about loneliness
Songs written by Max Martin
Songs written by Herbie Crichlow
Torch songs